Local elections were held in Greece on 26 May 2019 (first round) and 2 June 2019 (second round). Voters elected representatives to the country's local authorities, comprising 13 regions and 325 municipalities. New Democracy dominated the elections, winning 12 out of 13 Regions and 2 out of 3 biggest municipalities per population in the country. SYRIZA lost all the Regions that it had won in 2014.

Regions

Nationwide

Attica

Central Greece

Central Macedonia

Crete

Eastern Macedonia and Thrace

Epirus

Ionian Islands

North Aegean

Peloponnese

South Aegean

Thessaly

Western Greece

Western Macedonia

Major Municipalities

Athens

Thessaloniki

Patras

References

Local elections in Greece
2019 elections in Greece
2019 in Greek politics
May 2019 events in Europe
June 2019 events in Europe